Artavasdes I (also spelled Artawazd/Artavazd) was the Artaxiad king of Armenia from 159 BC to 115 BC. He was the son and successor of Artaxias I.

Artavasdes' name is the Latinized version of an Old Iranian name Ṛtavazdā, identical to the Avestan Ašavazdah, presumably meaning "powerful/persevering through truth". In , the Parthian king Mithridates II defeated Artavasdes I and made him acknowledge Parthian suzerainty. Artavasdes was forced to give the Parthians Tigranes as a hostage, who was either his son or nephew.

According to Professor Cyril Toumanoff, Artavasdes I can be identified with the Armenian king who, according to the medieval Georgian annals, interfered in Iberia at the request of local nobility and installed his son, Artaxias, on the throne of Iberia, thereby inaugurating the Iberian Artaxiad dynasty.

Background 
Artavasdes I was the oldest son of five of Artaxias I and Satenik, he was described by Khorenatsi as brave, but jealous, cruel, selfish, and power hungry. When he matured, his father, Artaxias, made him responsible for governing the eastern regions and was assigned as Sparapet.

Conflict with the Muratseans 
Artavasdes would find out about an affair between Argam Muratsean and Satenik, upon finding out he would convince King Artaxias that Argam was plotting against him and planned to take over the kingdom. Artaxias would grant Artavasdes Argam's second rank role. They later went to a banquet held by Argam and, on the pretext of a suspicion of a plot, Artavasdes began to quarrel with Argam. Amongst the confusion, King Artaxias returned to Artaxata and sent back Mazhan with an army to slaughter many of the Muratseans, burn down Argam's palace, and to bring Mandu, one of Argam's concubines. Two years later, Artaxias ordered Argam to five up his possessions, with the exception of his concubine.

Unsatisfied, Artavasdes also seized Naxuana and all the fortresses and villages south of the Araxes. He apropriated Argam's palace and renamed it to Artavazd's Palace (Armenian: Արտավազդի Ապարանք, todays Bənəniyar). Unable to bear this, one of Argam's son instigated a rebellion, however it was put down by Artavasdes and all the eminent men were slaughtered, while a few fled to Artaxata to gain refuge at the royal court.

Smbat's Departure 
After quelling the Caspian uprising, Smbat Bagratuni was awarded by Artaxias the royal portion of Goghtn and the springs of Ught. This caused Artavasdes to become jealous and started plotting against Smbat. King Artaxias eventually caught wind of this plot and was greatly disturbed, however Smbat left his position in the army and retired in Tmorik. With Smbat's absence, Artavasdes was granted command over the entire army. Seeking justice for the wrongdoings caused against Smbat, Mazhan requested that Artavasdes and Tigranes's be stripped and instead be entrusted to Zariadres. King Artaxias denied this request, thus Mazhan began plotting against Tigranes. However the plot was made known to Tigranes and Artavasdes, and during a hunting trip, killed Mazhan and burried him at Bagavan. The Vahevunis would take over Mazhan's position as Krmapet.

Seleucid Invasion 
In 165/4 BC, Antiochus IV Epiphanes invaded Armenia, capturing King Artaxias and pushing Tigranes's army to Basen. The Iberians, using this opportunity, invaded from the north. Artavasdes and Smbat hastened and joined Tigranes, while Zariadres headed north to counter the Iberian invasion. The Seleucid army would be defeated and forced to return home due to internal troubles. However, Zariadres would be captured by the Iberians after loosing a battle. Three years later, Smbat, Artavasdes, and Tigranes brought their armies to Trialeti, but negotiated with the Iberians, managing to return Zariadres and achieve an alliance with the Iberians, while ceding the regions of Javakhk and Ardahan. King Artaxias would return to Armenia in 161/0 BC, but would fall ill and die in Bakurakert in 160 BC.

Artaxias's Funeral 
Khorenatsi writes about a folktale that the minstrels of Goghtan sung about. That during Artaxias's funeral, Artavasdes complained about the state of the kingdom that Artaxias left it in. In response, Artaxias cursed him, saying that if he was to follow the Azat river, towards Masis, he would be taken by the Kaj and will never see the light of day again.

Reign 
Not much is know about Artavasdes's reign. After the death of King Artaxias, Artavasdes inherited the throne and became king in 159 BC. He would expel his brothers from the royal estates in Aghiovit and Arberan, except for Tigranes. In 120 BC, the Parthian king Mithradates II would begin a campaign against Armenia and defeated Artavasdes. Artavasdes was forced to recognize Parthian suzerainty over Armenia, as well as give Mithradates II his nephew, Tigranes II, as a hostage.

In around 90 BC, the eristavis of Iberia requested the aid of Artavasdes, to dethrone King Paranjom, who was attempting to spread the Zoroastrian faith among his people, and in his place be put Artavasdes's son, Artaxias, who was married to a Pharnavazid princess. Artavasdes agreed, in turn he would receive Iberian subjects from the eristavis. The eristavis of Kartli then renounced their support for Parnajom and Artavasdes and Artaxias advanced towards Kartli. The eristavis who broke off from Parnajom joined the Armenian Army at Tashir. Parnajom called for aid from the Parthians and marched down to Tashir. A battle would break out and Parnajom would be defeated and killed by the joint Iberian-Armenian army. Parnajom's son, Mirvan, would be taken by his tutor to Parthia. Artaxias would then be placed on the Iberian throne. It is most likely that during this period, Armenia rejected Parthian suzerainty over Armenia.

Death 
Khorenatsi writes about the death of Artavasdes, continuing from the tale of Artaxias's funeral, Artavasdes would go on a hunting trip near Mount Ararat. Confused by the giddiness of the animals, Artavasdes would turn his horse around only fall in a large pit and was swallowed without a trace. The minstrels of Goghtn also sing about how Artavasdes was imprisoned in a cave, bounded to chains. Occassionally two Aralezs try to break the chains, but the Kaj continues to strengthen these chains, and that he would destroy the country if he were to escape. This fable became popular with many Armenian blacksmiths, striking their anvils three to four times at the first day of the week, so that the chains of Artavasdes may be strengthened. However, despite this myth, it is most likely that Artavasdes committed suicide during hunting trip. His brother, Tigranes I would ascend to the throne.

Coinage 
Only two types of coins have been attributed to Artavasdes I, both written in Greek. The obverse of these coins depict Artavasdes I wearing an Armenian tiara. The reverses of the coins either depict Athena standing with a spear and shield, or an eagle atop a mountain.

References

Sources 
 
 
 
 

123 BC deaths
2nd-century BC kings of Armenia
2nd-century BC rulers
Year of birth unknown
Artaxiad dynasty
Vassal rulers of the Parthian Empire